Irsan Husen (7 December 1940 – 26 January 2007) was an Indonesian weightlifter. He competed in the men's light heavyweight event at the 1968 Summer Olympics.

References

External links
 

1940 births
2007 deaths
Indonesian male weightlifters
Olympic weightlifters of Indonesia
Weightlifters at the 1968 Summer Olympics
Sportspeople from Surabaya
20th-century Indonesian people
21st-century Indonesian people